John Paul Richard Thomas (born 1938) is an American taxonomist and systematist, and retired professor of herpetology and evolution at University of Puerto Rico-Rio Piedras (San Juan, Puerto Rico). He described several species new to science, mostly amphibians and reptiles, from throughout the Caribbean islands including the common coquí (Eleutherodactlys coqui), the national animal of Puerto Rico.

Early life and education
Thomas was born in Jacksonville, Florida, USA, on May 2, 1938. At the University of South Florida, Thomas graduated as a Bachelor of Arts in 1969. Later, he went to Louisiana State University and obtained a PhD in 1976.

Research
Thomas' research has focused mostly on amphibians and reptiles, spanning several fields from natural history to systematics and evolution. His studies have yielded descriptions of new species of dwarf geckos (Sphaerodactylus), blind snakes (Scolecophidia), and rain frogs (Eleutherodactylus).

Taxonomic descriptions
During his career as herpetologist, Thomas has described more than 60 new species. A non-comprehensive list of described new species includes:

Bachia panoplia 
Mitophis pyrites 
Sphaerodactylus parthenopion 
Typhlops syntherus 
Amphisbaena xera 
Eleutherodactylus coqui 
Eleutherodactylus schwartzi 
Sphaerodactylus elasmorhynchus 
Typhlops monastus 
Anolis rimarum 
Cubatyphlops epactius 
Celestus agasepsoides 
Amerotyphlops tasymicris 
Typhlops hectus 
Eleutherodactylus probolaeus 
Sphaerodactylus semasiops 
Sphaerodactylus cryphius 
Sphaerodactylus nycteropus 
Sphaerodactylus streptophorus 
Sibynomorphus oneilli 
Bolitoglossa digitigrada 
Sphaerodactylus omoglaux 
Sphaerodactylus williamsi 
Mitophis asbolepis 
Mitophis calypso 
Mitophis leptipileptus 
Eleutherodactylus amadeus 
Eleutherodactylus parapelates 
Sphaerodactylus ladae 
Sphaerodactylus perissodactylus 
Anolis placidus 
Celestus macrotus 
Typhlops schwartzi 
Typhlops tetrathyreus 
Typhlops titanops 
Typhlops catapontus 
Typhlops hypomethes 
Eleutherodactylus caribe 
Eleutherodactylus corona 
Eleutherodactylus dolomedes 
Eleutherodactylus guantanamera 
Eleutherodactylus ionthus 
Eleutherodactylus mariposa 
Eleutherodactylus melacara 
Sphaerodactylus cricoderus 
Sphaerodactylus schwartzi 
Sphaerodactylus plummeri 
Sphaerodactylus epiurus 
Amphisbaena carlgansi 
Diploglossus garridoi 
Sphaerodactylus pimienta 
Sphaerodactylus schuberti 
Sphaerodactylus ariasae 
Amphisbaena cayemite 
Amphisbaena leali 
Eleutherodactylus juanariveroi 
Typhlops agoralionis 
Typhlops anchaurus 
Typhlops anousius 
Typhlops arator 
Typhlops contorhinus 
Typhlops eperopeus 
Typhlops notorachius 
Typhlops paradoxus 
Typhlops perimychus 
Typhlops proancylops 
Typhlops satelles 
Typhlops sylleptor 

Nota bene: A binomial authority in parentheses indicates that the species was originally described in a different genus.

Eponyms
Richard Thomas is honored in the scientific name of a species of lizard, Liolaemus thomasi.

References 

1938 births
American taxonomists
American herpetologists
People from Jacksonville, Florida
University of Puerto Rico faculty
Living people